Domestic violence in Bolivia is a pervasive and underreported problem. According to the Center for the Information and Development of Women (CIDEM), 70 percent of women suffer some form of abuse. 

CIDEM noted that their 2006 statistics "did not reflect the full magnitude of the problem of violence against women" and that "a great number of women" did not report the aggression they faced on a daily basis. The most exhaustive national survey on domestic violence conducted by the National Statistical Institute in 2003 showed 64 percent of women were the target of some form of emotional, physical, or sexual abuse from their partner.

Government action 
In 2013, Bolivia passed a new comprehensive domestic violence law, which outlaws many forms of abuse of women, including marital rape. 

As of November 26, 2006, the police Family Protection Brigade had attended to 8,954 cases, as compared to approximately 5,200 in 2005, and 3,640 were cases of repeat offenders. It was estimated that most cases of domestic violence went unreported.

See also 
 Women in Bolivia
 Crime in Bolivia

References

Bolivia
Violence in Bolivia
Violence against women in Bolivia